Cochise Airlines was a commuter airline which was founded in 1971 in Tucson, Arizona.  It operated until the early 1980s.  Cochise linked small cities in Arizona with Phoenix, Arizona and Tucson, Arizona and also served southern California and New Mexico at one point.

History
According to the February 1, 1976 edition of the Official Airline Guide (OAG), Cochise was operating de Havilland Canada DHC-6 Twin Otter turboprop aircraft as well as Cessna 402 prop aircraft.  By 1979, the airline was flying  Swearingen Metroliner (Metro II) turboprops.  One route served with the Metro II at this time was Tucson (TUS) - Phoenix (PHX) - Yuma (YUM) - Imperial, CA (IPL) - Los Angeles (LAX) while another route served Phoenix (PHX) - Flagstaff (FLG) - Winslow (INW) - Gallup (GUP).  

Besides serving Phoenix, Tucson, Imperial and Yuma, the February 1, 1976 OAG listed scheduled service operated by Cochise into the following destinations in Arizona:  Flagstaff (FLG), Grand Canyon National Park Airport (GCN), Kingman (IGM), Lake Havasu City (LHU),  Page (PGA), Prescott (PRC) and Winslow (INW).   

By 1981, Cochise was flying a Convair 440 propliner nonstop between Tucson (TUS) and San Diego (SAN) and also on the Tucson - Phoenix - Yuma - El Centro - Los Angeles route in addition to Metro II propjet service on the latter route.  The Convair 440 was the largest aircraft type ever operated by the airline.  Also in 1981, Cochise was flying a Phoenix (PHX) - Blythe, CA (BLH) - Los Angeles (LAX) route in addition to operating its other routes within Arizona and southern California.  

The air carrier's two letter airline code in the OAG was "DP".

Destinations in 1974

According to its April 15, 1974 route map, Cochise was serving the following destinations:

 Douglas, Arizona
 Flagstaff, Arizona
 Fort Huachuca/Sierra Vista, Arizona
 Grand Canyon National Park Airport, Arizona
 Kingman, Arizona
 Lake Havasu City, Arizona
 Phoenix, Arizona - Hub
 Prescott, Arizona
 Tucson, Arizona - Home base and focus city
 Yuma, Arizona

Destinations in 1979

According to its November 15, 1979 route map, Cochise Airlines was serving the following destinations:

 Blythe, California
 Flagstaff, Arizona
 Fort Huachuca/Sierra Vista, Arizona
 Gallup, New Mexico
 Grand Canyon National Park Airport, Arizona
 Imperial, California - El Centro, California was served via the Imperial County Airport
 Kingman, Arizona
 Los Angeles, California (LAX)
 Phoenix, Arizona - Hub
 Prescott, Arizona 
 Tucson, Arizona - Home base
 Winslow, Arizona
 Yuma, Arizona

The airline also served San Diego, California during the early 1980s. 

Cochise ceased all operations on June 2, 1982.

Fleet
Piston aircraft:
 Cessna 402
 Convair 440 - largest aircraft type operated by the airline

Turboprop aircraft:
 de Havilland Canada DHC-6 Twin Otter
 Swearingen Metroliner (Metro II model)

See also 
 List of defunct airlines of the United States

References

Defunct airlines of the United States
Airlines established in 1971
American companies established in 1971
1971 establishments in Arizona
Airlines disestablished in 1982
Airlines based in Arizona